Tamara Radočaj (born 23 December 1987) is a Serbian professional women's basketball player who plays for Chevakata Vologda of the Russian Premier League. She also represents the Serbian national basketball team.

International career
She represented Serbian national basketball team at the EuroBasket 2015 in Budapest where they won the gold medal, and qualified for the 2016 Olympics, first in the history for the Serbian team.

References

External links
Profile at eurobasket.com
Profile at fiba.com
Profile at fibaeurope.com

1987 births
Living people
People from Vršac
Serbian women's basketball players
Point guards
ŽKK Partizan players
ŽKK Vršac players
Basketball players at the 2016 Summer Olympics
Olympic basketball players of Serbia
Olympic bronze medalists for Serbia
Medalists at the 2016 Summer Olympics
Olympic medalists in basketball
Serbian expatriate basketball people in Hungary
Serbian expatriate basketball people in Italy
Serbian expatriate basketball people in Russia
European champions for Serbia